Chaetostoma carrioni is a species of armored catfish from South America. These fish reach  SL. These fish are demersal and live in tropical, freshwater habitats. They are found in the Marañón River basin in Ecuador.

References

carrioni
Fish of South America
Freshwater fish of Ecuador
Fish described in 1935